Las Flecheras Airport  is an airport serving the city of San Fernando de Apure, the capital of the Apure state in Venezuela. The runway is just east of the city, along the Apure River.

The San Fernando non-directional beacon (Ident: SFD) and VOR-DME (Ident: SFD) are located on the field.

Airlines and destinations
As of late 2021, there are no scheduled services at the airport after Conviasa ceased the sole domestic route to Caracas.

See also
Transport in Venezuela
List of airports in Venezuela

References

External links
OpenStreetMap - Las Flecheras
OurAirports - San Fernando
SkyVector - San Fernando
 

Airports in Venezuela